is a New Zealand rugby union player who plays as a lock.

References

New Zealand rugby union players
1991 births
Living people
Rugby union locks
New Zealand expatriate sportspeople in Japan
Sunwolves players
Otago rugby union players
Kyuden Voltex players